KFXS (100.3 FM, "Real Rock 100.3 The Fox") is a radio station licensed to serve Rapid City, South Dakota.  The station is owned by HomeSlice Media Group, LLC. It airs a classic rock music format.

Notable on-air personalities include D. Ray Knight (weekdays 6-10), Jake Michaels (weekdays 10-2) and Gunner (weekdays 2-7) plus syndicated show Steve Gorman Rocks (weeknights 7-midnight).

The station was assigned the KFXS call letters by the Federal Communications Commission on October 28, 1994.

Ownership
In May 1999, Triad Broadcasting reached a deal to acquire this station from Brothers Jim and Tom Instad as part of a twelve-station deal valued at a reported $37.8 million.

In July 2006, Schurz Communications Inc. reached an agreement to buy this station from Triad Broadcasting Co. as part of a six-station deal valued at a reported $19 million. Schurz Communications created the Black Hills broadcast division, New Rushmore Radio, now known as Rushmore Media Company, Inc.

Schurz Communications announced on September 14, 2015 that it would exit broadcasting and sell its television and radio stations, including KFXS, to Gray Television for $442.5 million. Though Gray initially intended to keep Schurz' radio stations, on November 2, it announced that HomeSlice Media Group, LLC would acquire KFXS and the other Rushmore Media Company radio stations for $2.2 million; the deal reunited the stations with KBHB and KKLS, which HomeSlice acquired from Schurz in 2014 following its purchase of KOTA-TV. The HomeSlice purchase was consummated on February 15, 2016 at a price of $2.5 million.

References

External links
KFXS official website

FXS
Pennington County, South Dakota
Classic rock radio stations in the United States
Radio stations established in 1977